La Pobla de Claramunt is a municipality in the comarca of the Anoia in Catalonia, 
Spain. It is situated on the edge of the Òdena Basin at the entrance to the Capellades Gorge. The town 
is dominated by Claramunt castle, on a hilltop some 150 m above the modern settlement: the castle was, with 
Castellbell castle, one of the main points of control of access to the Llobregat valley and hence to Barcelona. 
With neighbouring Capellades, La Pobla de Claramunt is an important centre for paper manufacture. It is served 
by a station on the FGC railway line R6 from Barcelona and Martorell 
to Igualada and by the C-244 road from Igualada to Vilafranca del Penedès.

Demography

Subdivisions 
Five outlying villages are included in the municipality of La Pobla de Claramunt (Populations as of 2005):
Els Vivencs (45)
Barri de l'Estació (629)
Les Garrigues (116)
Els Masets (4)
La Rata (50)
El Xaró (155)
Les Cases Noves
Les Figueres

References

 Panareda Clopés, Josep Maria; Rios Calvet, Jaume; Rabella Vives, Josep Maria (1989). Guia de Catalunya, Barcelona: Caixa de Catalunya.  (Spanish).  (Catalan).

External links

Official website 
 Government data pages 

Municipalities in Anoia